Walter Patrick "Pat" Lang, Jr. (born May 31, 1940)  is a commentator on the Middle East, a retired US Army officer and private intelligence analyst, and an author. After leaving uniformed military service as a colonel, he held high-level posts in military intelligence as a civilian.  He led intelligence analysis of the Middle East and South Asia for the Defense Department and world-wide HUMINT activities in a high-level equivalent to the rank of a lieutenant general.

Background
Lang graduated from the Virginia Military Institute with a BA in English and from the University of Utah with an MA in Middle East Studies. He is a member of Phi Kappa Phi.

Personal life
He is married to the former Marguerite Lessard.  They reside in Alexandria, Virginia.

His uncle is John H. Lang, who served in both World Wars and during the interwar period, with Canadian and U.S. military forces.  He received military honors for his actions and bravery from the United Kingdom, United States and Japan.

Military service
While serving in the US Army, Lang graduated from the U.S. Army War College, the U.S. Army Command and General Staff College and the Armed Forces Staff College.  He is a decorated veteran of several of the United States' overseas conflicts. During the Vietnam War, he served in the U.S. Army Special Forces and Military Intelligence.

He was trained and educated as a specialist in the Middle East and served in that region for many years. He was the first professor of Arabic at the United States Military Academy, where he was twice selected as best classroom teacher of the year.

At the Defense Intelligence Agency, he was the defense intelligence officer (DIO) for the Middle East, South Asia and counter-terrorism, and later, the first director of the Defense Humint Service. At the DIA, he was a member of the Defense Senior Executive Service. He participated in the drafting of National Intelligence Estimates. From 1992 to 1994, all the U.S. military attachés worldwide reported to him.

He was also the head of intelligence analysis for the Middle East for seven or eight years at that institution.  He was the head of all the Middle East and South Asia analysis in DIA for counter-terrorism for seven years. For his service in the DIA, Lang received the Presidential Rank Award of Distinguished Executive.

Post-retirement activities
After leaving government service, he joined Veteran Intelligence Professionals for Sanity, but left that group over policy differences.  For a period prior to and during the Iraq War, he registered under the U.S. Department of Justice's Foreign Agents Registration Act, for his work on behalf of a Lebanese politician and industrialist. He promoted the peace process, vocational training for the building trades, English and French-language instruction, and extending microcredit. He registered on advice of counsel and has since deregistered.

Continuing his work on the peace process, he participated in work of the Harry Frank Guggenheim Foundation. As an example: Imagining the Next War. The foundation sponsors individuals for "scholarly research on violence, aggression, and dominance." In 2006, Lang was appointed to the foundation's board of directors.
Lang edits a personal blog Sic Semper Tyrannis on the subjects of intelligence gathering and analysis, military affairs, and war and peace.

Selected writings 
Since his retirement from the US Army, Lang has published many articles on intelligence, special operations and the Islamic World.  
"Drinking the Koolaid", Middle East Policy Journal, August 2004. In 2004, he wrote that members of the Bush Administration manipulated intelligence analysis to strengthen the case for the invasion of Iraq in 2003.

Lang has written and discussed the 2006 Lebanon War, in which he described the Hezbollah defense as a defensive belt which he called the "Tabouleh Line". In an interview with Helena Cobban, he said:

A basic lesson of history is that one must win on the battlefield to dictate the peace. A proof of winning on the battlefield has always been possession of that battlefield when the shooting stops. Those who remain on the field are just about always believed to have been victorious. Those who leave the field are believed to be the defeated.

Iraq and the Middle East
In 2006, Lang said that he thought an American attack on Iran would have deadly repercussions on U.S. occupation troops in Iraq. He noted that "troops all over central and northern Iraq are supplied with fuel, food, and ammunition by truck convoy from a supply base hundreds of miles away in Kuwait. All but a small amount of our soldiers' supplies come into the country over roads that pass through the Shiite-dominated south of Iraq." Iraqi Shiia could easily interdict these supplies, not easily replaced by air, once hostilities start.

Conflict with Iran
In an interview in 2007, he stated that "the U.S. has no plans to bomb Iran," to mean that intensive planning is at an advanced stage but no final decision has been made to push the button. He said the forces are largely in place. The bombing could be carried out by naval air from the aircraft carriers in place, missiles from the screening ships of the carrier groups, and air force assets. He said there is dissent in the U.S. administration at high levels whether to bomb Iran, and it is possible for high level resignations to occur even in the uniformed services. He said the concentration of forces has a dual purpose, to prod Iran toward serious negotiations and to be there as a resort if negotiations fail.

Memoir

In December 2020, Lang published his memoir under the title TATTOO—A Memoir of Becoming.  It was published by I-Universe.  The 406-page autobiography offers a first-hand account of some of the most important events of the 20th century, starting with his uncle John Lang's Navy service in China during the pre-World War II period, his father's Army service in the Philippines and Germany, and Lang's own lengthy career after graduating from Virginia Military Institute, first in Army Special Forces, later in Military Intelligence and the Defense Intelligence Agency.  Lang's account of his two tours of duty in Vietnam are vivid and capture the agony of that conflict from both a personal and strategic standpoint.  His accounts of his service in the Middle East as a special advisor to the Iraqi Armed Forces during the Iran-Iraq War, as Military Attache in Yemen and Saudi Arabia, and his other special missions in the region is equally gripping and full of personal insights into U.S. policy.

2nd edition of The Human Factor

In 2021 Lang published an updated book-length version of an earlier work under the title "The Human Factor: 
The Phenomena of Espionage." It was published by iUniverse.  The book is a primer on the art of human intelligence, drawing on Lang's extensive experience recruiting agents while in the US Army in Vietnam, and later as head of the Humint section of the Defense Intelligence Agency.  The book draws upon the history of successful spy recruitment, including a critical review of the Cambridge Five spy network.

The original edition, Intelligence: The Human Factor, was published by Chelsea House, Philadelphia (2004) as a social sciences textbook on Human Intelligence Collection Operations.

The Portable Pat Lang

In December 2022, Lang released an anthology of his writings on intelligence, the Iraq War, Islam, the Middle East, and other critical topics.  The volume, published by iUniverse, featured previously unpublished historical fiction, as well as his most important writings and speeches.  The book is titled "The Portable Pat Lang."

Historical fiction
Based on his experience in the military and military intelligence and a lifelong interest in the American Civil War, Patrick Lang wrote three novels set in the American Civil War. The trilogy is called: "Strike The Tent: A Tale Of The Confederate Secret Services". His main character is Confederate agent Claude Devereux around whom the historical events unfold.

The first volume, The Butchers Cleaver, was published in 2007. In this book Claude Devereux, who like his whole family in Alexandria does neither support slavery nor secession, is forced by events into his role as Confederate agent.

The second volume, Death Piled Hard, was published in 2009. Devereux's brother Patrick is killed at Gettysburg. But there is not much time to mourn for Claude Devereux, who is slowly finding his way into command circles behind enemy lines.

The third volume, Down the Skies', was published in 2012. Confederate spy Devereux, by now Brigadier General of the Volunteer Union Forces, not only gained the confidence of president Lincoln but is also getting deeper and deeper insights into the whole administration. But he is suspected of disloyalty, and the Union's Counter-intelligence is on high alert.

Legacy and honors

Books
Intelligence: The Human Factor, Chelsea House Publishers, Philadelphia, PA, 2004 – a social sciences textbook on Human Intelligence Collection Operations (HUMINT).
Memoir: Tattoo, A Memoir of Becoming, iUniverse Books, Bloomington, IN 12/30/2020- a military autobiography .
``The Portable Pat Lang: Essential Writings on History, War, Religion, Strategy, iUniverse Books, Bloomington, IN 12/15/2022 

Fiction:The Butcher's Cleaver (Volume One of the "Strike the Tent" trilogy), Rosemont Books, 2007, Death Piled Hard (Volume Two of the "Strike the Tent" trilogy). iUniverse, 2009 Down The Sky  (Volume Three of the "Strike the Tent" trilogy). iUniverse, 2012 

Articles
"Drinking the Koolaid", Middle East Policy Journal, Washington, DC, Volume XI, Summer 2004, Number 2.
"Wahhabism and Jihad," America, New York, New York, March 10, 2003.
"Speaking Truth to Power,"  America, New York, New York, August 4, 2003.
"Jackson's Valley Campaign and the Operational Level of War." Parameters Carlisle Barracks, Pennsylvania, Army War College Winter 1985.
"The Best Defense Is…", Military Review, Command and General Staff College, Ft. Leavenworth, KS August, 1976.
"Contemplating the Ifs..." (with Larry C. Johnson), The National Interest, The Nixon Center, Washington, D.C., Number 83, Spring 2006.
"Dear Hearts Across The Seas," America, New York, New York, May 29, 2006.

References

External links
Copy of Official Defense Intelligence Agency Biography pdf format
Sic Semper Tyrannis 2007 Lang's Political blog
Athenaeum Lang's Military History and Literary blog
Profile: Patrick Lang, Center for Cooperative Research.
Patrick Lang on the Department of Homeland Security, BBC, June 7, 2002.
Interview with Patrick Lang: Targeting Saddam, Public Broadcasting Service, April 8, 2003.
Seymour Hersh. Selective Intelligence, The New Yorker, May 5, 2003.
Interview with Colonel Patrick Lang, CNN, July 19, 2003.
A conversation between Patrick Lang and Joseph C. Wilson on Iraq, University of Virginia NewsMakers, October 31, 2003.
Interview with Colonel Patrick Lang, CNN, November 8, 2003.
Interview with Patrick Lang on how Bush bungled the War on Terror, Democracy Now, April 2, 2004.
Patrick Lang. Drinking the Kool-Aid, Middle East Policy'', Summer 2004.
Interview with Patrick Lang on Iraq Insurgency, National Public Radio, August 21, 2004.
Interview with Patrick Lang on Iraqi Insurgents, National Public Radio, September 17, 2005.
Video Lecture on Islam St. Mary's University in San Antonio, Texas February 7, 2007

United States Army officers
United States Army personnel of the Vietnam War
Virginia Military Institute alumni
American non-fiction writers
Living people
Presidential Rank Award recipients
Analysts of the Defense Intelligence Agency
United States Army Command and General Staff College alumni
United States Army War College alumni
Recipients of the Legion of Merit
Recipients of the Defense Superior Service Medal
1940 births
American male novelists
Knights of the Holy Sepulchre
American male non-fiction writers